Oregon Pine was a six-masted lumber schooner completed in 1920, which was built as a result of the shipbuilding efforts associated with World War I. She sailed in the West Coast lumber trade, bringing lumber from the Columbia River to Shanghai and Port Adelaide, Australia.

Construction
Oregon Pine was completed in 1920, as part of a contract by the Emergency Fleet Commission "for 12 hulls of its own design, to be delivered without engines. There were no cancellations." Her name was to be Cotys, with a sister ship of Cossa, both six-masted schooners. Upon completion, the schooners were renamed Oregon Pine and Oregon Fir, and later in their careers, Dorothy H. Sterling and Helen B. Sterling, respectively. The schooners were chartered for offshore voyages from the Columbia River with lumber. The two ships were of identical specifications: 2,526 tons, 267 ft. long, with a capacity of 2,225,000 feet of lumber.

Voyages
The Oregon Pine made her last offshore voyage in 1924. She was laid up at Astoria, Oregon, where Capt. Sterling purchased her in 1926, renaming her Dorothy H Sterling Oregon Pine and Oregon Fir were both operating "quite steadily" from the Columbia River in 1926 for the Shanghai Building Co.

Fate
In 1928, the Dorothy H Sterling carried lumber from Puget Sound to Port Adelaide, Australia. There she was "libelled for harbor dues and crew wages." The ship was broken up in Port Adelaide in 1930 and her remains were towed to the Garden Island Ships' graveyard near Port Adelaide on 6 June 1932 where they remain to the present time.

Gallery

References

See also
List of large sailing vessels

Schooners of the United States
Lumber schooners
Six-masted ships
Individual sailing vessels
Merchant ships of the United States
Ships built in Portland, Oregon
Columbia River
1920 ships
Shipwrecks of South Australia